Adromischus subviridis is a succulent plant species in the genus Adromischus. It is endemic to the Succulent Karoo of Northern Cape of South Africa.

Distribution 
Adromischus subviridis is found from Loeriesfontein to Nieuwoudtville and Calvinia.

Conservation status 
Adromischus subviridis is classified as Least Concern with an EOO of 3945 km2. Known from a few collections; though this could be due to it being overlooked rather than it being rare.

References

External links 
 

Endemic flora of South Africa
Flora of South Africa
Flora of the Cape Provinces
subviridis